The 1st Qatari Stars Cup started on October 8, 2009.

The Stars Cup is one of four competitions in the 2009–10 Qatari football season. 12 clubs are taking part in the tournament.

They were divided into two groups of six teams, with the winner and runner-up of each group will advancing to the semi-finals.

Groups

Fixtures and results

Group 1

Group 2

Semi-finals

Final

Qatari Stars Cup
Football competitions in Qatar
2009–10 in Qatari football